Shin Dong-yup is a Korean name consisting of the family name Shin and the given name Dong-yup, and may also refer to:

 Shin Dong-yup (poet) (1930-1969), Korean poet
 Shin Dong-yup (entertainer) (born 1971), South Korean entertainer